The Battle of Fort Blakeley took place from April 2 to April 9, 1865, in Baldwin County, Alabama, about  north of Spanish Fort, Alabama, as part of the Mobile Campaign of the American Civil War. At the time, Blakeley, Alabama, had been the county seat of Baldwin County.

The Battle of Blakeley was the final major battle of the Civil War, with surrender just hours after Grant had defeated Lee at Appomattox on the morning of April 9, 1865. Mobile, Alabama, was the last major Confederate port to be captured by Union forces, on April 12, 1865. After the assassination of President Lincoln on April 15, 1865, other Confederate surrenders continued into May 1865.

Course of the battle

Maj. Gen. Edward Canby's Union forces, the XVI and XIII Corps, moved along the eastern shore of Mobile Bay, forcing the Confederates back into their defenses. Union forces then concentrated on Spanish Fort, Alabama, and nearby Fort Blakeley. By April 1, Union forces had enveloped Spanish Fort, thereby releasing more troops to focus on Fort Blakeley. Confederate Brig. Gen. St. John R. Liddell, with about 4,000 men, held out against the much larger Union force until Spanish Fort fell on April 8 in the Battle of Spanish Fort. This allowed Canby to concentrate 16,000 men for the attack on April 9, led by Brig. Gen. John P. Hawkins. Sheer numbers breached the Confederate earthworks, compelling the Confederates, including Liddell, to surrender within about 30 minutes in the final assault after 5:30 pm.

The casualty figures are approximate, but an estimated 75 Confederate soldiers were killed, with over 2,800 captured, and 150 Union troops were killed with 650 wounded during the siege and assault. The siege and capture of Fort Blakeley was basically the last combined-force battle of the war. Yet, it is criticized by some (such as Ulysses S. Grant) as an ineffective contribution to Union war effort due to Canby's lateness in engaging his troops. The battle was actually fought hours after the Confederate General Robert E. Lee surrendered at Appomattox. The battle is considered the last major battle of the Civil War with the exception of the Battle of Columbus, Georgia, fought a few days later. African-American forces played a major role in the successful Union attack, with 5,000 colored troops of the Union U.S.C.T. brought through Pensacola, FL.

Two days later, the two nearby island batteries in the Blakeley River were abandoned.
After this battle, Union forces were finally able to occupy the city of Mobile, Alabama, on April 12, 1865.

Legacy
The site of the battle is now a historical park, Historic Blakeley State Park. The American Battlefield Trust and its partners, including the Historic Blakeley Foundation, have saved 126 acres of Fort Blakeley Battlefield through November 2021.

Opposing forces

Union

Confederate

Notes

References
 
 National Park Service CWSAC Battle Summary
 Update to the Civil War Sites Advisory Commission Report on the Nation's Civil War Battlefields - State of Alabama
 Silkenat, David. Raising the White Flag: How Surrender Defined the American Civil War. Chapel Hill: University of North Carolina Press, 2019. .

External links
 
 
 The Battle of Fort Blakley: Battle Maps, History Articles, Photos, and Preservation News (CWPT)

Mobile campaign (1865)
Battles of the Lower Seaboard Theater and Gulf Approach of the American Civil War
Union victories of the American Civil War
Sieges of the American Civil War
Battles of the American Civil War in Alabama
Baldwin County, Alabama
1865 in the American Civil War
1865 in Alabama
African Americans in the American Civil War
April 1865 events